Lakestan Rural District is in the Central District of Salmas County, West Azerbaijan province, Iran. At the National Census of 2006, its population was 11,486 in 2,773 households. There were 11,589 inhabitants in 3,195 households at the following census of 2011. At the most recent census of 2016, the population of the rural district was 10,387 in 3,083 households. The largest of its 28 villages was Qarah Qeshlaq, with 2,040 people.

References 

Salmas County

Rural Districts of West Azerbaijan Province

Populated places in West Azerbaijan Province

Populated places in Salmas County